Khanapur Vidhan Sabha seat is one of the 288 Vidhan Sabha (legislative assembly) constituencies of Maharashtra state in western India. It is a segment of Sangli Lok Sabha constituency. This seat was named 'Khanapur' until 1972. Then its name, and area under it, changed to 'Khanapur Atpadi', from 1978 to 2004. From 2008 onwards it was back to 'Khanapur' only, after the boundaries of constituencies were redrawn again.

There is a vidhan sabha seat by the same name (Khanapur) in Karnataka.

Overview
Khanapur constituency is one of the eight Vidhan Sabha constituencies located in the Sangli district. It comprises the entire Khanapur and Atpadi tehsil and part of the Tasgaon tehsil (Visapur Circal) of the district.

Khanapur is part of the Sangli Lok Sabha constituency along with five other Vidhan Sabha segments in this district, namely Miraj, Sangli, Palus-Kadegaon, Tasgao-Kavathemahakal and Jat.

This constituency comes under drought prone area where every year farmers are facing problems of water. The famous grape growing area comes under this zone.

Members of Legislative Assembly
 1972: Sampatrao Sitaram Mane, Indian National Congress
 1978: Salunkhe Sahajirao Ganapatrao, Indian National Congress
 1980: Hanmantrao Yashwantrao Patil, Indian National Congress (U)
 1985: Sampatrao Sitaram Mane, Indian National Congress
 1990: Anil Babar, Indian National Congress
 1995: Rajendra (Anna) Deshmukh, Independent
 1999: Anil Babar, Nationalist Congress Party
 2004: Sadashivrao Hanmantrao Patil, Independent
 2009: Sadashivrao Hanmantrao Patil, Indian National Congress
 2014: Anil Babar, Shiv Sena
 2019: Anil Babar, Shiv Sena

Election results

Maharashtra Assembly Elections 1972
Seat name = 'Khanapur', until 1972 elections.

Maharashtra Assembly Elections 2004
Seat name = 'Khanapur Atpadi', from 1978 to 2004 elections.

Maharashtra Assembly Elections 2009

Maharashtra Assembly Elections 2014

See also
 Khanapur (Vita)
 Vita
 Khanapur Atpadi Assembly constituency 
 List of constituencies of Maharashtra Vidhan Sabha

References

Assembly constituencies of Maharashtra
Sangli district